Jarkko Nikara (born 28 April 1986) is a Finnish rally driver. He lives in Saarijärvi, Finland.

Career 
Nikara started racing at the age of 16 in national autocross competitions. The next year, he participated in Finnish rallysprint races, winning the junior championship. In 2006, he was the Finnish Junior rally champion. The next year, he was second in the national group N championship. In 2009, he participated in six WRC rounds, including his home race, as part of the Pirelli Star Driver competition.

In 2010, Nikara is racing in the British Rally Championship, driving a Renault Twingo Sport R2.

Complete WRC results

* Season still in progress.

JWRC results

PWRC results

References

External links 
 Official homepage

1986 births
Living people
Finnish rally drivers